The 1953 Iowa Hawkeyes football team represented the University of Iowa in the 1953 Big Ten Conference football season. Led by second-year head coach Forest Evashevski, the Hawkeyes compiled an overall record of 5–3–1 with a mark of 3–3 in conference play, placing in a three-way tie for fifth in the Big Ten. The team played home games at Iowa Stadium in Iowa City, Iowa.

Schedule

Roster

Rankings

Game summaries

Minnesota

at Notre Dame

Awards and honors

Jerry Hilgenberg – All-American

1954 NFL Draft

References

Iowa
Iowa Hawkeyes football seasons
Iowa Hawkeyes football